Kusini District (Wilaya ya Kusini in Swahili)  is one of two administrative districts of Unguja South Region in Tanzania. The district is comparable in size to the land area of Saint Vincent and the Grenadines. The district has a water border to the east, south and west by the Indian Ocean. The district is bordered to the north by Kati District. The district seat (capital) is the town of Makunduchi. According to the 2012 census, the district has a total population of 39,242. The district is home to the oldest mosque in use in East Africa, the historic Kizimkazi Mosque, also a National Historic Site. The district is also frequently visited by Spinner dolphins, which is one of the biggest tourism attractions in the district.

Administrative subdivisions
As of 2012, Kusini District was administratively divided into 10 wards.

Wards

 Bwejuu
 Kajengwa
 Kibigija
 Kikadini
 Kizimkazi
 Mtegani

 Mtende
 Muungoni
 Muyuni
 Mzuri
 Paje

References

Districts of Tanzania